Love, Lies & Therapy is the tenth studio album by American rock band Saliva. It was released on June 10, 2016.

Track listing

Personnel
Bobby Amaru – vocals
Wayne Swinny – lead guitar
Jonathan Montoya - rhythm guitar
Brad Stewart – bass 
Paul Crosby – drums

References

2016 albums
Saliva (band) albums